Claude de Givray (born 7 April 1933) is a French film director and screenwriter. In 1960 he was co-director with François Truffaut for Tire-au flanc. He directed the 1965 film Un mari à un prix fixe, which starred Anna Karina.  He was François Truffaut's co-writer to his films Stolen Kisses and Bed and Board. Between the two films he wrote and directed the mini-series Mauregard starring Claude Jade, the heroine of the two Truffaut-Films. His last movie as Director was Dernier banco in 1984, starring Jean-Pierre Cassel and Michel Duchaussoy. In 1988 Claude Miller made the film The Little Thief based on a book by de Claude de Givray and Truffaut.

Selected filmography
 The Army Game (1960 - director)
 Un mari à un prix fixe (1965 - director)
 L'amour à la chaîne (1965 - director)
 Stolen Kisses (1968 - writer)
 Mauregard (1969 - writer, director)
 Domicile conjugal (1970 - writer)
 Dernier banco (1984 - writer, director)
 The Little Thief (1988 - writer)
 François Truffaut: Stolen Portraits (1993 - himself)

References

External links

1933 births
Living people
French film directors
French male screenwriters
French screenwriters